Michael Guffey is a professional skateboarder based in Venice, Los Angeles and sponsored by ZJ Boarding House. He and his ZJ Boarding House team won gold at ESPN X Games 16 held in Los Angeles. He is featured skateboarding in the music video "Venice Cheap Skates feat. Paco" by Do It Live.

References

Living people
American skateboarders
Year of birth missing (living people)